Leclercqia is a genus of square-headed wasps in the family Crabronidae, containing only one described species, Leclercqia formosana.

References

Further reading

 
 

Crabronidae
Insects described in 1968